Collective Music Group (also known as CMG the Label, formerly known as Cocaine Muzik Group), is a record label founded by Yo Gotti. The label's current president is Yo Gotti's cousin, Brandon Mims. The label houses artists Blac Youngsta, BlocBoy JB, Moneybagg Yo, 42 Dugg, EST Gee, Mozzy, Big Boogie, Lil Poppa, Lehla Samia, and GloRilla.

History
In 2012, Yo Gotti launched his own record label after signing to Epic Records. The label was originally named Cocaine Muzik Group based on the "addictiveness of the music released by the label", but decided to change the name after a phone call with 50 Cent who said "they’re going to be scared of that." The label's first official release was Yo Gotti's sixth studio album I Am. On May 24, 2014, the label released a collective project featuring the whole roster titled Chapter One, including Wave Chapelle, Zed Zilla, and Snootie Wild.

In 2015, CMG signed Memphis rapper Blac Youngsta following the single "Heavy", in which Yo Gotti appeared on the song's remix. In 2016, CMG signed Memphis rapper Moneybagg Yo. In 2018, the label signed Blocboy JB. In 2019, CMG expanded and signed Detroit rapper 42 Dugg in a joint venture deal with Lil Baby's 4PF. The record label also signed Memphis rapper Big Boogie in 2020.

In January 2021, CMG announced the signing of Louisville rapper EST Gee. On June 3, 2021, Yo Gotti signed a distribution deal with CMG and Interscope Records saying, "we share the same vision about winning – we want to break barriers, disrupt the industry and develop the next generation of superstars. I'm thrilled to partner with them as I continue focusing on CMG's expansion."

On February 10, 2022, CMG launched a press conference announcing the signing of Sacramento rapper Mozzy. In April 2022, CMG signed Jacksonville rapper Lil Poppa. In May 2022, the label signed R&B artist Lehla Samia, becoming the first singer and female artist signed to the label. In July 2022, CMG signed Memphis rapper GloRilla, with Yo Gotti saying she "is a natural born star – she has a different sound and approach that's needed in hip-hop right now".

On July 15, 2022, CMG released their second compilation album titled Gangsta Art.

Roster

Current artists

Former artists
 Wave Chapelle 
 Zed Zilla
 Snootie Wild (Deceased)

Discography

Compilation albums

Singles

References

American record labels
Contemporary R&B record labels
Hip hop record labels
Record labels established in 2012
Music publishing companies of the United States
Companies based in Memphis, Tennessee
Yo Gotti